The White Hen is a 1921 British silent comedy film directed by Frank Richardson and starring Mary Glynne, Leslie Faber and Pat Somerset. It was based on a novel by Phyllis Campbell.

Cast
 Mary Glynne as Celeste de Crequy
 Leslie Faber as Duc de Crequy
 Pat Somerset as Beaufort Lynn
 Cecil Humphreys as Louis St. Romney

References

Bibliography
 Low, Rachael. History of the British Film, 1918-1929. George Allen & Unwin, 1971.

External links

1921 films
1921 comedy films
British comedy films
British silent feature films
Films directed by Frank Richardson
British black-and-white films
1920s English-language films
1920s British films
Silent comedy films